Holcocera panurgella is a moth in the family Blastobasidae. It is found in Arizona, United States.

The larvae feed on the seeds of Pinus species.

References

Moths described in 1920
panurgella